Øivind Andersen (born 12 October 1944) is a Norwegian philologist.

He was born in Oslo, and took the dr.philos. degree in 1976 with the thesis Paradeigmata. Beiträge zum Verständnis der Ilias. He was appointed as a professor at the University of Trondheim in 1980, and from 1989 to 1993 he was the first director of the Norwegian Institute at Athens. In 1997 he became professor at the University of Oslo. He is a member of the Norwegian Academy of Science and Letters.

References

1944 births
Living people
Academic staff of the Norwegian University of Science and Technology
Academic staff of the University of Oslo
Norwegian philologists
Classical philologists
Hellenists
Members of the Norwegian Academy of Science and Letters
Royal Norwegian Society of Sciences and Letters